Sir Michael Neil O'Sullivan KBE (2 August 1900 – 4 July 1968) was an Australian politician and lawyer. He served as a Senator for Queensland from 1947 to 1962, representing the Liberal Party. He held senior ministerial positions in the post-war Menzies Government, serving as Minister for Trade and Customs (1949–56), Minister for the Navy (1956), and Attorney-General (1956–58).

Early life
O'Sullivan was born on 2 August 1900 in Toowong, Queensland. He was the fifth child born to Patrick Alban O'Sullivan and his wife Mary Bridget (née Macgroarty), both of Irish Catholic descent. His uncles Thomas O'Sullivan and Neil MacGroarty served in the Queensland Legislative Assembly, as did his paternal grandfather Patrick O'Sullivan.

O'Sullivan attended the state school in Taringa before completing his education at St. Joseph's Nudgee College. He followed his father into the legal profession, serving articles of clerkship with firms in Brisbane and Warwick. He did not attend law school but was admitted as a solicitor in December 1922 by examination. He subsequently took over his father's practice in Brisbane, later forming a partnership with John Joseph Rowell.

Regarded as "a leader of Brisbane's mercantile sector", O'Sullivan was president of the Brisbane Chamber of Commerce from 1936 to 1937 and the Property Owners' Protection Association from 1937 to 1938. He served in the Royal Australian Air Force from May 1942 to December 1944, performing intelligence and administration in Australia and the South-West Pacific. He was commissioned as a flying officer and met future prime minister John Gorton while stationed at Milne Bay.

Political career

O'Sullivan ran unsuccessfully for the United Australia Party (UAP) in the Division of Brisbane at the 1934 federal election. He was also an unsuccessful candidate for the Queensland UAP in the seat of Windsor at the 1941 state election.

At the 1946 federal election, O'Sullivan won a seat in the Senate for the Liberal Party of Australia as one of only three non-Labor members in the Senate.  Following the 1949 election, he became leader of the government in the Senate and he was appointed Minister for Trade and Customs in the Menzies government.  He was appointed Minister for the Navy in January 1956.  In August 1956, he was appointed Attorney-General following the resignation of John Spicer and in October 1956, he was appointed Vice-President of the Executive Council following the resignation of Eric Harrison, but he retired from the ministry in 1958.  He did not stand for re-election at the 1961 election. After leaving politics he became a director of LJ Hooker.

Views
In his maiden speech to parliament, O'Sullivan spoke of his belief in the doctrine of natural rights deriving from God. He was a social conservative, supporting heavy censorship as a safeguard against "indecency, blasphemy and sedition". Although he voted for the Matrimonial Causes Act 1959, which established uniform national divorce laws, he believed that divorce violated the divine law and stated that "a valid consummated Christian marriage is indissoluble". He was an anti-communist and cited the papal encyclical Quadragesimo anno in a 1947 speech against the Chifley Government's bank nationalisation bill.

Personal life
O'Sullivan married Jessie McEncroe on 3 April 1929, with whom he had two sons. He was a devout Catholic and was a close connection of Archbishop James Duhig, with his biographer Duncan Waterson stating that "on matters of faith, morals, censorship and conservative Catholic social thought the two were as one". O'Sullivan was made Knight Commander of the Order of the British Empire in 1959.

O'Sullivan died unexpectedly of a coronary occlusion while visiting Sydney in 1968. He was survived by his wife and two sons. He was accorded a state funeral and was buried in Nudgee Cemetery.

Notes

|-

Liberal Party of Australia members of the Parliament of Australia
Members of the Australian Senate for Queensland
Australian Knights Commander of the Order of the British Empire
Australian politicians awarded knighthoods
Members of the Cabinet of Australia
20th-century Australian lawyers
1900 births
1968 deaths
Burials at Nudgee Cemetery
20th-century Australian politicians
Royal Australian Air Force personnel of World War II
Royal Australian Air Force officers